Alexey Gogua (Abkhaz: Алықьса Ноча-иҧа Гәагәуа; born 15 March 1932 in Gup village, Ochamchira District, Socialist Soviet Republic of Abkhazia) is an Abkhaz writer. He studied at the Sukhumi Pedagogical University and Maxim Gorky Literature Institute in Moscow. He was the first chairman of the organization Aidgylara. Gogua took actively part in the political life of the republic and was a deputy of the Supreme Soviet of the USSR. His works are often considered as constituting the best prose in Abkhaz language. His works have been translated into many languages of the former USSR and additionally into English, German, Spanish, Hungarian, Polish and Bulgarian.

References

External links
Aleksey Gogua, a writer in Sukhumi (an interview)

1932 births
Living people
Abkhazian writers
People from Ochamchira District
Maxim Gorky Literature Institute alumni